Protein Wnt-2b (formerly Wnt13) is a protein that in humans is encoded by the WNT2B gene.

This gene encodes a member of the wingless-type MMTV integration site (WNT) family of highly conserved, secreted signaling factors. WNT family members function in a variety of developmental processes including regulation of cell growth and differentiation and are characterized by a WNT-core domain. This gene may play a role in human development as well as human carcinogenesis. 
This gene produces two alternative transcript variants.

References

Further reading